Stary Las may refer to the following places:
Stary Las, Greater Poland Voivodeship (west-central Poland)
Stary Las, Opole Voivodeship (south-west Poland)
Stary Las, Pomeranian Voivodeship (north Poland)